BI-LO was an American supermarket chain owned by Southeastern Grocers, headquartered in Jacksonville, Florida.  In the time of the banner’s elimination, supermarkets under the BI-LO brand were operated in Georgia, South Carolina, and North Carolina.

History
In 1961, Frank Outlaw, a former Winn-Dixie executive, bought four Greenville, S.C. grocery stores from the chain Wrenn and Syracuse, to create the Wrenn & Outlaw chain. The company was officially named BI-LO in 1963 after Outlaw conducted an employee store-naming contest to develop the "brand." His secretary, Edna Plumblee, won the contest by submitting the name "BI-LO."

BI-LO was sold to Ahold, a Dutch retail food conglomerate, in 1977. In 1994, Ahold purchased Red Food Stores, Inc. and merged its locations (around 55 of them) in Georgia, Alabama, and Tennessee into BI-LO the following year. In 2001, Ahold purchased the Birmingham, Alabama based Bruno's Supermarkets chain and combined its operations with BI-LO.

In 1998, the company sponsored the construction of the BI-LO Center, now named the Bon Secours Wellness Arena in Greenville, South Carolina.

In June 2001, BI-LO debuted their discount grocery format, FoodSmart in Camden, South Carolina. A month later, BI-LO purchased eight Harris Teeter grocery stores in South Carolina and converted those stores to either BI-LO or the FoodSmart formats.

In 2003, BI-LO invested in redesigning its store layout to attract high end customers. The result was the new Super BI-LO concept of a larger store layout featuring a greater selection of healthier foods, specialty foods, and organic foods. The company opened new Super BI-LO branded stores as well as remodeled older stores in affluent neighborhoods during this redesign period.

In 2005, Ahold sold BI-LO/Bruno's to Lone Star Funds. In order to concentrate on renovating older stores, building new ones, and investing in newer information technology, the new owners sold off 104 BI-LO, FoodSmart, Bruno's, Food Fair, and Food World stores in areas where the chain did not have significant market penetration. They also sold off three BI-LO/Bruno's distribution centers to grocery wholesaler, C&S Wholesale Grocers who converted some of the stores to Southern Family Markets. Included in the sell-off were all stores in the Knoxville, TN, area which nearly all were immediately occupied by Food City stores. As of 2010, one location in the area has not been leased to any business in five years, in part due to Food City already owning a former Winn-Dixie location just a short walk away.

On March 21, 2007, Lone Star Funds announced the corporate spin-off of the 67 Bruno's Supermarkets and Food World stores from BI-LO LLC into a separate company to be based out of Birmingham. On April 16, 2007, Lone Star announced the 230-store BI-LO chain was up for sale. Soon after, C&S announced that it was closing the Chattanooga distribution center that served the BI-LOs in the Chattanooga area and portions of North Georgia.

On March 23, 2009, the company announced that it had filed Chapter 11 bankruptcy with the intent to use the court-supervised process to address "an upcoming debt maturity." The move was largely due to the post-2008 crash and the resultant credit crisis. The company said to expect its stores and regular operations to continue to operate as usual during the process. The company secured a $100 million loan from GE Capital in order to continue paying wages, salaries, benefits, suppliers, and vendors. In October 2009, Delhaize Group, headquartered in Belgium and owner of competing chain Food Lion, announced that it had entered a preliminary, non-binding agreement to purchase $425 million worth of assets from the chain. Shortly after, in November 2009, the company filed plans with the U.S. Bankruptcy Court to restructure, with their parent company, Lone Star Funds, providing a $350 million cash infusion. Delhaize Group and Food Lion were subsequently left out of the submitted plans. Lone Star Funds said that it was possible that BI-LO could emerge from bankruptcy in the first quarter of 2010.

On May 12, 2010, the company emerged from bankruptcy. BI-LO, ranked by Supermarket News in the Top 75 Retailers, remained under ownership of Lone Star Funds after restructuring. BI-LO was reportedly put up for sale in August 2010; Kroger and Publix were said to be interested in acquiring the chain, but nothing developed from these rumors.

In September 2013, BI-LO agreed to buy 22 Piggly Wiggly stores in South Carolina and Georgia from Piggly Wiggly Carolina. The following day, BI-LO agreed to sell seven BI-LO locations in the Charlotte, North Carolina region to Publix.

In July 2015, Southeastern Grocers announced the sale of its 21 BI-LO locations in the Chattanooga market as well as eight BI-LO locations in Northern Georgia to K-VA-T Food Stores, which would rebrand the stores under its Food City banner. The two companies said that stores would begin transitioning August 30 and would be completed by October 5, 2015. Southeastern Grocers was expected to use proceeds from the deal to reduce debt. This sale ended BI-LO's presence in the Tennessee market.

In May 2017, Southeastern Grocers announced the closing of six BI-LO stores in North Carolina and South Carolina as part of a corporate-wide closure of 20 locations along with the elimination of some department lead roles at stores. Later that same month, BI-LO announced the closings of three additional stores in Newton, North Carolina and Florence and Irmo, South Carolina.

In February 2019, Southeastern Grocers announced plans to close 22 locations. This round of closures included 13 BI-LO locations in Georgia, North Carolina, and South Carolina.

2018 bankruptcy
On March 15, 2018, Southeastern Grocers announced they would file a plan of reorganization under Chapter 11 by the end of March. According to the company, the restructuring would decrease overall debt levels by over $500 million. Under this plan, 22 BI-LO stores would close along with an additional 72 stores across the Harveys, Fresco y Más, and Winn-Dixie brands.

On March 28, 2018, Southeastern agreed to sell three BI-LO locations in South Carolina along with three Harveys locations in Georgia to three independent Piggly Wiggly store owners. The deals are in conjunction with the restructuring support agreement revealed by Southeastern Grocers. On April 27, 2018, Food Lion announced plans to acquire four BI-LO locations in Florence, Myrtle Beach, Surfside Beach, and Columbia, South Carolina. On April 30, 2018, Publix announced they would acquire the lease, fixtures, equipment, permits, and licenses for the Seneca, South Carolina BI-LO location slated to close as part of the original restructuring plan. Two of the BI-LO locations originally closed as part of the bankruptcy reorganization in April 2018, Ladson and Mullins, South Carolina, were acquired by another independent Piggly Wiggly owner and would be reopened in June 2018.

In May 2018, Southeastern Grocers restructuring plan was confirmed by a U.S. Bankruptcy judge in Delaware. At the end of that month, Southeastern Grocers announced that it had completed its financial restructuring and was emerging from bankruptcy. As part of the restructuring, $522 million in debt was exchanged for equity in Southeastern Grocers, though it was not announced who was receiving the equity shares. Southeastern Grocers exited bankruptcy with 575 stores in seven states, down from 704 locations. They also announced a planned remodels of 100 stores in 2018.

Acquisition of Winn-Dixie
On December 19, 2011, it was announced that BI-LO and Winn-Dixie would merge to create an organization with some 690 grocery stores and 63,000 employees in eight states throughout the southeastern United States. BI-LO will purchase Winn-Dixie for $530 million, and operate Winn-Dixie as a subsidiary with its stores maintaining the Winn-Dixie name. It was later announced that the merged company would be based at Winn-Dixie's former headquarters in Jacksonville, Florida. In early 2013, BI-LO phased out its own private label soft drinks in its BI-LO stores in favor of the "Chek" brand used by Winn-Dixie.

Elimination of the BI-LO banner

On June 9, 2020, Southeastern Grocers announced the decision to no longer operate stores under the BI-LO banner. As part of an effort to reach that goal, Southeastern reached an agreement to sell 62 stores, including 46 BI-LO and 16 Harveys Supermarkets, to Ahold Delhaize subsidiary Food Lion. As part of that agreement, they would also be transitioning their Mauldin, South Carolina, distribution center over to Ahold Delhaize USA Distribution, LLC. Both of these closed in the first half of 2021, at which point over 60 stores began to transition to the Food Lion banner.  Following the announcement, Food Lion purchased additional stores in 2021 located in North and South Carolina that were scheduled to close, acquiring roughly 70 stores total.

In addition, as part of the same announcement, Southeastern announced they will be divesting the assets of 57 of the in-store pharmacies it operates under the BI-LO and Harveys Supermarket banners to CVS Pharmacy and Walgreens. These locations included all of the company's BI-LO pharmacies and nine Harveys Supermarket pharmacies in Georgia. The transition was expected to begin within two weeks of the press release date.

On September 1, 2020, it was announced that Southeastern Grocers was selling 20 BI-LO stores in South Carolina and Georgia to Alex Lee, Inc who would rebrand the stores as KJ's Market, IGA and Lowes Foods. In the same announcement, 2 additional BI-LO and one Harvey's Supermarket location in South Carolina would be sold to independent operator B&T Foods. Following the sale, BI-LO would have 39 stores remaining in Georgia, North Carolina and South Carolina.

On December 21, 2020, two independent Piggly Wiggly owners, with support from C&S Wholesale Grocers, announced plans to acquire one BI-LO supermarket in South Carolina and another in Georgia from Southeastern Grocers. Both locations were previously Piggly Wiggly stores that were acquired by SEG in 2013.

The stores that were not sold to any other operators were closed on or by April 18, 2021, ending the 60 year run of the BI-LO banner.

Slogans 

 "When You BI-LO, You Get More Than Low Prices": prior to 1990
 "Why Pay More...": 1990-early 2000s
 "The Name Fits" - 1990s
 "Everybody's favorite way to save" - early 2000's - 2007
 "Real Savings. Real Fresh.": 2007-2010
 "Savings without sacrifice.": 2010-2015
 "Proudly serving the Southeast since 1961.": 2015–2021

Private labels

Throughout late 2004 and 2005, the company gradually phased out its private label "BI-LO" brand for its store products and replaced them with new packaging and a new name, "Southern Home", which began also being offered at Harveys Supermarkets locations after Southeastern Grocers' acquisition of the chain from Delhaize.  In the late 2000s, the chain started offering the budget-conscious Clear Value brand on select products, supplied by Topco.  Beginning in 2017, the Southern Home banner used for private-label products began to be phased out for a tiered brand entitled SE Grocers, which was the private label brand used at all Southeastern Grocers owned stores, including Winn-Dixie (whose namesake private label brand was phased out).

References

External links

 

Economy of the Southeastern United States
Supermarkets of the United States
Companies that filed for Chapter 11 bankruptcy in 2009
Companies that filed for Chapter 11 bankruptcy in 2018
Retail companies established in 1961
1961 establishments in South Carolina
Companies based in Jacksonville, Florida